Yacine Louati (born 4 March 1992) is a French professional volleyball player. He is a member of the France national team and a gold medallist at the Olympic Games Tokyo 2020. At the professional club level, he plays for Fenerbahçe.

Honours

Clubs
 National championships
 2017/2018  French SuperCup, with Chaumont VB 52
 2020/2021  Polish Championship, with Jastrzębski Węgiel

Individual awards
 2015: Belgian Championship – Best Server

State awards
 2021:  Knight of the Legion of Honour

References

External links

 
 Player profile at LegaVolley.it 
 Player profile at PlusLiga.pl 
 
 Player profile at Volleybox.net

1992 births
Living people
Sportspeople from Tourcoing
French men's volleyball players
Polish Champions of men's volleyball
Olympic volleyball players of France
Volleyball players at the 2020 Summer Olympics
Medalists at the 2020 Summer Olympics
Olympic gold medalists for France
Olympic medalists in volleyball
Mediterranean Games medalists in volleyball
Mediterranean Games bronze medalists for France
Competitors at the 2013 Mediterranean Games
European Games competitors for France
Volleyball players at the 2015 European Games
French expatriate sportspeople in Belgium
Expatriate volleyball players in Belgium
French expatriate sportspeople in Italy
Expatriate volleyball players in Italy
French expatriate sportspeople in Poland
Expatriate volleyball players in Poland
French expatriate sportspeople in Turkey
Expatriate volleyball players in Turkey
Jastrzębski Węgiel players
Fenerbahçe volleyballers
Outside hitters
20th-century French people
21st-century French people